The list of ship decommissionings in 2003 includes a chronological list of all ships decommissioned in 2003.


See also 

2003
 Ship decommissionings
Ship